Quatuor pour la fin du temps, originally Quatuor de la fin du temps ("Quartet of the End of Time"), also known by its English title Quartet for the End of Time, is an eight-movement piece of chamber music by the French composer Olivier Messiaen. It was premiered in 1941. The work is scored for clarinet (in B-flat), violin, cello, and piano; a typical performance of the complete work lasts about 50 minutes. Messiaen wrote the piece while a prisoner of war in German captivity and it was first performed by his fellow prisoners. It is generally considered one of his most important works.

Composition and first performance
Messiaen was 31 years old when France entered World War II. He was captured by the German army in June 1940 and imprisoned in Stalag VIII-A, a prisoner-of-war camp in Görlitz, Germany (now Zgorzelec, Poland). While in transit to the camp, Messiaen showed the clarinetist Henri Akoka, also a prisoner, the sketches for what would become Abîme des oiseaux. Two other professional musicians, violinist  and cellist Étienne Pasquier, were among his fellow prisoners, and after he managed to obtain some paper and a small pencil from a sympathetic guard (1902–1989), Messiaen wrote a short trio for them; this piece later became the quartet's Intermède. Later, he decided to write for the same trio with himself at the piano, developing it into its current state. The combination of instruments was unusual at the time, but not without precedent: Walter Rabl had composed for it in 1896, as had Paul Hindemith in 1938.

The quartet was premiered at the camp on 15 January 1941 in front of about 400 prisoners and guards. Messiaen claimed that 5,000 people attended the performance and that the musicians had decrepit instruments, but those claims are now considered "somewhat exaggerated". The cello was bought with donations from camp members. Messiaen later recalled, "Never was I listened to with such rapt attention and comprehension."

Several months later, Messiaen was released (with the help of Brüll) thanks to an entreaty by his former organ teacher and professor at the Paris Conservatoire, Marcel Dupré, as Messiaen scholar Nigel Simeone writes:

Messiaen and Etienne Pasquier (cellist at the initial premiere) later recorded the quartet on LP for Club Français du Disc (1956), together with Jean Pasquier (violin) and André Vacellier (clarinet).

Inspiration
Messiaen wrote in the Preface to the score that the work was inspired by text from the Book of Revelation (Rev 10:1–2, 5–7, King James Version):
And I saw another mighty angel come down from heaven, clothed with a cloud: and a rainbow was upon his head, and his face was as it were the sun, and his feet as pillars of fire ... and he set his right foot upon the sea, and his left foot on the earth .... And the angel which I saw stand upon the sea and upon the earth lifted up his hand to heaven, and sware by him that liveth for ever and ever ... that there should be time no longer: But in the days of the voice of the seventh angel, when he shall begin to sound, the mystery of God should be finished ...

Structure
The work is in eight movements:

Below, quotations are translated from Messiaen's Preface to the score.

I. "Liturgie de cristal"
In his preface to the score, Messiaen describes the opening of the quartet:

Written for the full quartet, the opening movement begins with the solo clarinet imitating a blackbird's song and the violin imitating a nightingale's song. The underlying pulse is provided by the cello and piano: the cello cycles through the same five-note melody (using the pitches C, E, D, F-sharp, and B-flat) and a repeating pattern of 15 durations. The piano part consists of a 17-note rhythmic pattern permuted strictly through 29 chords, as if to give the listener a glimpse of something eternal.

II. "Vocalise, pour l'Ange qui annonce la fin du temps"
Also for the full quartet, Messiaen writes of this movement:

III. "Abîme des oiseaux"
Messiaen writes:

A solo for the clarinet, this movement is a test for even the most accomplished clarinetist, with an extremely slow tempo marking . It was originally written in Verdun.

IV. "Intermède"
A trio for violin, cello, and clarinet, Messiaen writes of this movement:

V. "Louange à l'Éternité de Jésus"
Messiaen writes:

A duet for cello and piano, the music is arranged from an earlier composition, "IV. L'Eau" from "Fête des belles eaux" for 6 Ondes Martenots, performed at the Paris International Exposition of 1937. The tempo marking is infiniment lent, extatique ("infinitely slow, ecstatic").

VI. "Danse de la fureur, pour les sept trompettes"

Messiaen writes of this movement, which is for full quartet:

Toward the end of the movement the theme returns, fortissimo, in augmentation and with wide changes of register. It is in unison throughout.

VII. "Fouillis d'arcs-en-ciel, pour l'Ange qui annonce la fin du temps"
Messiaen writes of this quartet movement:

VIII. "Louange à l'Immortalité de Jésus"
Messiaen writes:

A duet for violin and piano, the music is an arrangement of the second part of his earlier organ piece "Diptyque" (1930), transposed up a major third from C to E.

Derivative works
The piece is the inspiration for Quartet for the End of Time, a 2014 novel by Johanna Skibsrud that borrows its title and structure from the piece.

Primary sources
 Olivier Messiaen, Quatuor pour la fin du temps (score) (Paris: Durand)
 Anthony Pople, Messiaen:  Quatuor pour la fin du temps, Cambridge Music Handbooks (Cambridge University Press, 2003)

References

External links
 Nigel Simeone on Quatuor pour la fin du temps
 Quatuor pour la fin du temps (with synchronised score), played by Barnaby Robson, James Clark, David Cohen, and Matthew Schellhorn
 "Sur le Quatuor pour la fin du temps" – extensive analysis by François Nicolas (in French).
 Boston University Messiaen Project: performances, studies and information
 "Quatuor pour la fin du temps" – Musical and Biblical Analysis from Lawrence University Freshman Studies curriculum
 "Music for the End of Time" – an appreciation by Michael R. Linton
 Quartet for the End of Time – the documentary film by H. Paul Moon

Compositions by Olivier Messiaen
Compositions for piano quartet
1941 compositions
Apocalyptic music